HD 140283 (also known as the Methuselah star) is a metal-poor subgiant star about 190 light years away from the Earth in the constellation Libra, near the boundary with Ophiuchus in the Milky Way Galaxy. Its apparent magnitude is 7.205, so it can be seen with binoculars. It is one of the oldest stars known. The star's light is somewhat blueshifted as it is moving toward rather than away from the Earth and it has been known to astronomers for over a century as a high-velocity star based on its other vectors (proper motion). An early spectroscopic analysis by Joseph W. Chamberlain and Lawrence Aller revealed it to have a substantially lower metal content than the Sun. Modern spectroscopic analyses find an iron content about a factor of 250 lower than that of the Sun. It is one of the closest metal-poor (Population II) stars to Earth.

The star was already known by 1912 when W. S. Adams measured its astrometry using a spectrograph in the Mount Wilson Observatory.

Age and significance

Because HD 140283 is neither on the main sequence nor a red giant, its early position in the Hertzsprung–Russell diagram has been interpreted with its data and theoretical models of stellar evolution based on quantum mechanics and the observations of processes in millions of stars to infer its apparent old age. For field stars (as opposed to stars in clusters), it is rare to know a star's luminosity, surface temperature, and composition precisely enough to get a well-constrained value for its age. Because of their relative scarcity, this is even rarer for a Population II star such as HD 140283. A study published in 2013 used the Fine Guidance Sensors of NASA's Hubble Space Telescope to measure a precise parallax (and therefore distance and luminosity) for the star. This information was used to estimate an age for the star of 14.46 ± 0.8 billion years. Due to the uncertainty in the value, this age for the star would possibly conflict with the calculated age of the Universe as determined by the final 2018 Planck satellite results of 13.761±0.038 billion years. However, more recent models of its stellar evolution have suggested revision of the star's age to 13.7 billion years or 12 billion years.

Once dubbed the "Methuselah Star" by the popular press due to its age, if the assumptions of stellar evolution are correct in the report, the star must have formed soon after the Big Bang and is one of the oldest stars known as of 2021. The search for such very iron-poor stars has shown they are almost all anomalies in globular clusters and the Galactic Halo. This accords with a narrative that they are rare survivors of their generation. If so, the apparent visual data of the oldest of these enables us to longstop-date the reionization (first star formation) phase of the Universe independently of theories and evidence of the first few million years after the Big Bang. Most stars from Population II and Population III are no longer observable. Theories exist allowing for an older age of the universe than conventionally accepted, which can still accommodate the observed redshift of early objects and earlier radiation. Some depart from the conventional big-bang/inflation model, such as the steady-state and cyclic models. To date no accurate, greater-age evidence from a cosmic object has been found that calls into question the Planck satellite results.

Studies of the star also help astronomers understand the Universe's early history. Very low but non-zero metallicities of stars like HD 140283 indicate the star was formed from existing materials in the second generation of stellar creation; their heavy-element content is believed to have come from zero-metal stars (Population III stars), which have never been observed. Those first stars are thought to have been formed from existing materials a few hundred million years after the Big Bang, and they died in explosions (supernovae) after only a few million years. A second generation of stars, the generation in which HD 140283 is theorized to have been formed from existing materials, could not have coalesced until gas, heated from the supernova explosions of the earlier stars, cooled down. This hypothesis of such stars' birth and our best models of the early universe indicate that the time it took for the gases to cool was likely only a few tens of millions of years.

The proportions of elements in such metal-poor stars is modelled to tell us much of the earlier nucleosynthetic ("metals") yield, that is of elements other than hydrogen and helium from the supernovae of the locally-extinct Population III stars. Some of the latter may be visible in gravitational lensing in looking at deepest images such as the Hubble Ultra-Deep Field (i.e., their brief existence before their turning into supernovae). While the proportions of these elements is much lower in HD 140283 than in the Sun, they are not as low as is the case for iron. The implication is that the first population of stars generated the alpha elements preferentially to other groups of elements, including the iron peak and s-process. Unlike those other metal-poor stars, HD 140283 has a detectable amount of lithium, a consequence of HD 140283 having not yet evolved into a red giant and thereby not yet having undergone the first dredge-up.

See also
 Libra in Chinese astronomy
 HE 1523-0901

References

Durchmusterung objects
1195
140283
076976
Libra (constellation)
G-type subgiants
High-proper-motion stars
Population II stars